Piranhas is a municipality in western Goiás state, Brazil.  It is a large producer of milk and has a large herd of cattle.

Location
Piranhas is located on the Piranhas River and is served by highways:  BR-158, which connects Jataí to Aragarças; and GO-060, which connects Piranhas to Iporá.

The distance to the state capital, Goiânia, is 321 km.  Highway connections are made by GO-060 / Trindade / Nazário / São Luís de Montes Belos / Israelândia / Iporá / Arenópolis.

Municipal boundaries are with:
north and west:  Bom Jardim de Goiás
east: Arenópolis
south:  Palestina de Goiás and Doverlândia

Demographic Information
The population density was 5.44 inhabitants/km2 in 2007.  There were 8,872 urban dwellers and 2,267 rural dwellers.  The population has declined by about 4,000 people since 1980.

Economic Information
The economy is based on mining, agriculture, cattle raising, services, public administration, and small transformation industries.  In 2007 there were 19 small transformation industries and 128 commercial units.  There were three banks: Banco do Brasil S.A. - BRADESCO S.A. - Banco Itaú S.A. 
There were two dairies: Maroca Indústria de Laticínios. - Lactosul Ind. de Laticínios Ltda (May 2006)

The main crops in 2006 were pineapple, rice, bananas, beans, manioc, soybeans, and corn.  The cattle herd was large with 192,000 head in 2006.

Agricultural data 2006
Number of farms:  790
Total area:  207,550 ha.
Area of permanent crops: 162 ha. (bananas and pineapple)
Area of perennial crops: 1,421 ha. (soybeans, corn, rice)
Area of natural pasture:  152,180 ha. 
Area of woodland and forests:  45,753 ha.
Cattle herd: 192,000
Number of workers: 1,800
Number of farms with tractors: 142
Number of tractors:  179    IBGE

Education and Health
In 2006 there were 12 schools, 103 classrooms, 194 teachers, and 3,602 students.  In 2007 there were 3 hospitals with 87 beds. 
Higher education: Campus of the State University of Goiás
Adult literacy rate: 84.8% (2000) (national average was 86.4%)
Infant mortality rate: 28.24 (2000) (national average was 33.0).

Tourism
There is potential for eco-tourism with conditions for hiking, going down rapids, and other sports activities practiced near nature.  The São Domingos river is ideal for canoeing, and descending on rafts or tire-tubes. Hikers can walk through virgin forests, which have unexplored caves.

Municipal Human Development Index:  0.773
Ranking in state:  118/245
National ranking:  2249/5507

History
Settlement began in 1948 when engineers and workers building the road between Caiapônia and Aragarças arrived in the region and set up camp on the banks of the Piranhas River.  A settlement was created with the name of Piranhas, after the river.  In 1952 it became a district of Caiapônia, receiving its municipal autonomy in 1953.

See also
 List of municipalities in Goiás
Microregions of Goiás

References

Frigoletto

Municipalities in Goiás